Sir Peter Edlin Webster (16 February 1924 – 10 April 2009) was a British barrister and High Court judge.

References 

 https://www.ukwhoswho.com/view/10.1093/ww/9780199540891.001.0001/ww-9780199540884-e-39195
 https://www.telegraph.co.uk/news/obituaries/law-obituaries/5286771/Sir-Peter-Webster.html

Knights Bachelor
2009 deaths
Queen's Bench Division judges
Fleet Air Arm personnel of World War II
Fleet Air Arm aviators
1924 births